Johannes Kert (3 December 1959 – 4 March 2021) was an Estonian politician and military officer. He served as the Commander of the Estonian Defence Forces from 1996 until 2000. He retired from the military in 2008. Since 2014, Kert had been a member of the Estonian Reform Party.

Effective dates of promotion

Soviet Army
See Military ranks of the Soviet Union

Estonian Land Forces
See Military ranks of Estonia

Awards, decorations, and recognition

Decorations and badges

References

External links

Johannes Kert. Member of the Riigikogu
Johannes Kert. NATO Biographies

|-
 

1959 births
2021 deaths
People from Pechory
Estonian Reform Party politicians
Members of the Riigikogu, 2015–2019
Members of the Riigikogu, 2019–2023
Estonian lieutenant generals
Soviet military officers
University of Tartu alumni
Recipients of the Military Order of the Cross of the Eagle, Class II
Commanders Grand Cross of the Order of the Lion of Finland